The 59th Infantry Division (59-ya Pekhotnaya Diviziya) was an infantry formation of the Russian Imperial Army.

Organization
1st Brigade
233rd Infantry Regiment
234th Infantry Regiment
2nd Brigade
235th Infantry Regiment
236th Infantry Regiment

References

Infantry divisions of the Russian Empire